The Traveler And Other Favorites is an album by the progressive bluegrass band Country Gentlemen, recorded in 1968.

Track listing

 The Border Incident
 Johnny Reb
 The Traveler
 Baby Blue
 Theme From Exodus
 Working On A Road
 Many A Mile
 Matterhorn
 Buffalo Girls
 Amelia Earthart
 Dark as a Dungeon
 Beautiful Life

Personnel
 Charlie Waller - guitar, vocals
 John Duffey - mandolin, vocals
 Eddie Adcock - banjo, vocals
 Ed Ferris - bass, vocals

References

External links
 https://web.archive.org/web/20091215090142/http://www.lpdiscography.com/c/Cgentlemen/cgent.htm

1968 albums
Rebel Records albums
The Country Gentlemen albums